Staudt is a surname. Notable people with the surname include:

Erwin Staudt (born 1948), German businessman and football manager
Herman R. Staudt (born 1926), American government official
Johann Bernhard Staudt (1654–1712), Austrian Jesuit composer
Karl Georg Christian von Staudt (1798–1867), German mathematician 
Kathleen Staudt (born 1946), American political scientist
Linda Staudt (born 1958), Canadian long-distance runner
Louis M. Staudt (born 1955), American cancer researcher
Maureen Sander-Staudt, American philosopher
Nancy Staudt (born 1963), American law school dean
Virginia Staudt Sexton (1916–1997), American psychologist
German toponymic surnames